Velankanni railway station is a terminal station in Velankanni town in the Indian state of Tamil Nadu.

Jurisdiction
It belongs to the Tiruchirappalli railway division of the Southern Railway zone in Nagapattinam district in Tamil Nadu. The station code is VLNK.

About
The station belongs to the Tiruchirappalli railway division of Southern Railway zone.

Trains

See also
 Velankanni
 Indian Railways
 Basilica of Our Lady of Good Health

References

External links
VLNK/Velankanni at India Rail Info

Trichy railway division
Railway stations in Nagapattinam district
Railway stations opened in 2010
Railway terminus in India